Uphill All The Way is a 1986 American comedy Western film directed by Frank Q. Dobbs and starring Roy Clark, Mel Tillis, Glen Campbell, Burl Ives, Trish Van Devere, Elaine Joyce, Frank Gorshin and Sheb Wooley. The film has developed a very small cult following among Western fans.

Plot
Southwestern United States; circa 1916.  Two bumbling good ol' boys, Ben and Booger, are thrown off a train after failing to show their tickets. They wander into a saloon/brothel and attempt unsuccessfully to cheat their way into a fortune at the card table.

Penniless, they try to trade their shotgun for a loan at the bank, causing a teller to sound the alarm. They try to escape by hitching a lift from a driver who thinks they’re stealing his car at gunpoint, and runs away to demand that they face justice. The sheriff forms a posse to capture them, but Ben and Booger "terrorize" two U.S. Army troopers with their shotgun, allowing them to steal their horses and uniforms. The sheriff orders the two now out-of-uniform troopers to join the hunt, and there is a chaotic chase across the west, with gunfights galore. Ben and Booger escape by train into Mexico, but can’t find their tickets, so once again they get flung off the train. We’re left to assume that they’re off to launch their next fraudulent scheme.

Cast
 Roy Clark as Ben
 Mel Tillis as Booger
 Frank Gorshin as Pike
 Richard Paul as Bank Teller
 Burl Ives as Sheriff
 Glen Campbell as Captain
 Burton Gilliam as Corporal 
 Gailard Sartain as Private
 Elaine Joyce as Miss Jessie
 Sheb Wooley as Anson Sudro
 Trish Van Devere as Widow Quinn
 Rockne Tarkington as Leon
 Pedro Gonzalez Gonzalez as Carlos "Chicken Carlos"
 Burt Reynolds as The Gambler (uncredited)
 Jo Perkins as Mrs. Sudro
 David Logan Rankin as Tom Sudro

External links
 
 

1986 films
American Western (genre) comedy films
1986 comedy films
Films shot in Texas
1980s English-language films
1980s American films
1980s Western (genre) comedy films